The Kansas Relays are a three-day track meet every April, held at the University of Kansas in Lawrence, Kansas. Since 1923, the Kansas Relays have attracted runners, throwers, and jumpers from all over the United States of America, bringing in athletes ranging from Olympians to high-schoolers. Olympians such as Marion Jones and Maurice Greene compete in the Gold Zone portion of the meet, which attracts thousands of spectators every year. Competitors have also broken world records at the meet. The 2004 Olympic champion, Justin Gatlin, was a prominent athlete to fail a doping test at the Kansas Relays.

History
The Kansas relays were founded by John H. Outland, the head football coach at the University of Kansas, in 1923. He got the idea for the Kansas Relays from the Penn Relays. The Penn Relays are held at the University of Pennsylvania and is the oldest and largest track meet in the United States. Outland attended the University of Pennsylvania for medical school and where he first saw the Penn relays. John Outland thought that there should be an event like the Penn relays in Kansas so in 1920 he approached Kansas basketball coach Forrest Clare Allen, also known as Phog Allen, who was also the athletic director, football and basketball coach at the University of Kansas. Three years later in 1923 the Kansas relays were founded.

More than 600 athletes participated in the 1st annual Kansas relays on April 20, 1923. During the relays early years the meet featured collegiate athletes in track and field such as Tom Poor, Ed Weir, and Tom Churchill were some of the athletes who later competed in the Olympics. Tom Poor was the first to win the high jump event in Kansas Relays, with a jump of six feet and a quarter inch. He later went on to place fourth in the 1924 Olympics. Ed Weir set a world record for the 120 meter high hurdles at the Kansas Relays in 1926. With world-class athletes competing in the relays, the first decade of the relays paved the way for the Kansas Relays to be a major event in the track and field event in the Mid-West.

1962 was the first year that female athletes were able to compete in the Kansas Relays and by 1976 women were competing in a number of different events. In 1996 a new event was added for women, the pole vault. Stacy Dragila was the first women to win this event and set an American record at the Kansas Relays. In 1997 the Kansas Relays added the 3000 m steeplechase to the women's events.

The Kansas Relays are held normally every year, but were cancelled in 1943, 1944, and 1945 because of World War II; in 1998 and 1998 because Memorial Stadium was being renovated; and in 2020, 2021, and 2022 because of issues presented by the COVID-19 pandemic. The last day of the relays was also cancelled in 2022 because of severe weather.

The Gold Zone
In 2005, the Kansas Relays added a new section: the Gold Zone. The Gold Zone was created because the relays started to lose the interest of spectators and athletes. Tim Weaver, then the meet director, created the Gold Zone to bring in more interest for the Relays and create a three-hour meet-within-a-meet. 
The Gold Zone was a part of the meet that features some of the best athletes in track and field in the top events. 24,000 spectators came to see former American Olympians, world champions, and top NCAA athletes compete in various events in the first Gold Zone. The events included in the Gold Zone include finals for all the dashes (100m, 400m, hurdles, etc.), 4x100 meter relay, 4x400 meter relay, the high jump, pole vault, the women's 3000 meter steeplechase and the men's one mile run. Marion Jones, Maurice Greene, Jearl Miles-Clark, Amy Acuff, and Nick Hysong are some of the Olympians and world record holders that have competed in the Gold Zone. Gold Zone II drew over 26,000 fans in 2006 making the track meet one of the top ten largest in the world.

Justin Gatlin doping test

Olympic gold medalist in the 100 meter Justin Gatlin tested positive for testosterone at the Kansas Relays 2006. On April 22, 2006 Justin competed with his teammates, Sprint Capitol, in the 4x100 meter race at the Kansas Relays. Justin and his team took first place with a time of 38.16 seconds.

On July 29, 2006, Justin Gatlin announced to the media that he had tested positive for high levels of testosterone at the Kansas Relays. Justin Gatlin was facing a lifetime ban from track and field, because he had already tested positive for an amphetamine 2001 at the Junior Olympics. It was determined that the amphetamine came from a prescription he had been taking for years. Justin avoided the lifetime ban by cooperating with doping authorities. On December 31, 2007 it was announced that Gatlin would be banned from track for four years, which made him ineligible to compete in the 2008 Beijing Summer Olympics.

Meet records

Men

Women

References
General
 Kansas Relays results archive
 Kansas Relays All-time records, as of 2009 (contains mistakes)

Specific

External links
 Official website

Sports in Kansas
University of Kansas
Track and field competitions in the United States
College track and field competitions in the United States
1923 establishments in Kansas
Track and field in Kansas